Charles William "Willy" Moore Jr. (born May 24, 1946) is a retired vice admiral in the United States Navy. He was an interim Superintendent of the United States Naval Academy in Annapolis, Maryland from June 5, 2003 until Vice Admiral Rodney P. Rempt was appointed superintendent on August 1, 2003. He is a 1968 graduate of the Naval Academy. Moore is also a former Commander of the U.S. Naval Forces, Central Command, commander of the Fifth Fleet in Bahrain, and Deputy Chief of Naval Operations, Fleet Readiness and Logistics. From January 1, 2003 until his retirement on October 1, 2004, he was U.S. naval aviation's Gray Eagle.

In 2004, Moore began to work with Lockheed Martin and in 2009, he was named "Chief Executive-United Arab Emirates for Lockheed Martin Global, Inc."

References
 

1946 births
Living people
United States Naval Academy alumni
United States Naval Aviators
United States Navy personnel of the Vietnam War
Salve Regina University alumni
Naval War College alumni
United States Navy admirals
Superintendents of the United States Naval Academy